The following is a list of MTV Asia Awards winners for Favorite Video.

MTV Asia Awards